Richard Jamieson Scott  (born 1938), also known as Dick Scott, is a Canadian jurist who served as Chief Justice of Manitoba. In that capacity, he presided over the Manitoba Court of Appeal from 1990 to 2013. Among his most notable decisions are those in the cases Rebenchuk v Rebenchuk (2007), Manitoba Métis Federation Inc v Canada (Attorney General) et al. (2010), O’Brien v Tyrone Enterprises Ltd (2012), and, while he was on the Court of Queen's Bench of Manitoba, R v Lavallee.

Early life and career 
Scott was born on March 20, 1938, and raised in St. Vital, Manitoba, in what has since become a neighbourhood of Winnipeg. He had wanted to become a test pilot, but as his eyesight was not good enough, he turned to law. He attended the University of Manitoba, graduating with a Bachelor of Arts degree in 1959 and a Bachelor of Laws degree and a Governor General's Academic Gold Medal in 1963. He married his wife Mary  with whom he went on to have three daughters.

Scott had started working for Thompson, Dilts, Jones, Hall, Dewar & Ritchie in 1961 and became an associate following his call to the bar in May 1963. He later became a partner in the firm (which adopted their current name, Thompson Dorfman Sweatman, in 1973) and was appointed as Queen's Counsel in 1976. He was the chairperson of the civil litigation subsections of the Canadian Bar Association and the Manitoba Bar Association from 1975 to 1978, he sat on the board Legal Aid Manitoba from 1976 to 1982, and he was a bencher of the Law Society of Manitoba from 1980 to 1984, serving as its president from 1983 to 1984.

Court of Queen's Bench 
Scott stayed with Thompson Dorfman Sweatman until 1985 when he was appointed to the Court of Queen's Bench of Manitoba. He appointed to the bench on June 28, 1985, and was promoted to be the Associate Chief Justice of the court three months later on October 4.

In 1990, he served as the trial judge in R v Lavallee, a case which was ultimately heard by the Supreme Court of Canada and which granted legal recognition to battered woman syndrome as a defence. The decision has been described by legal scholar Richard F. Devlin as "monumental".

Chief Justiceship 
On July 31, 1990, Scott was appointed to the Manitoba Court of Appeal as the tenth Chief Justice of Manitoba, succeeding Alfred Monnin.

O'Brien v Tyrone Enterprises 
Among Scott's most notable decisions while sitting on the Court of Appeal was in O'Brien v Tyrone Enterprises (2012). In the personal injury case, the plaintiff's lawyers were representing her for a contingency fee and were "not prepared to front the costs of the medical and actuarial witnesses who would be required when the issues of damages were addressed unless the defendant was found to be liable." As the plaintiff's only income was the $7,000–7,400 per year which she received from her disability pension through the Canada Pension Plan, the plaintiff could not cover these costs herself and therefore applied for severance of the civil trial on liability and damages.

Such applications are rarely granted in Manitoba, in accordance with Justice Guy Joseph Kroft's decision in Investors Syndicate v Pro-Fund Distributors Ltd which held that it is the "normal preference of the court ... to hear and determine all issues at one time and to discourage the piecemeal trial of actions." However, Kroft acknowledged that severance may be granted in "appropriate circumstances" and provided a series of considerations that should be weighed by judges. Taking this into consideration, the motions judge, Justice Albert L. Clearwater, overturned the decision of the master and allowed the application, holding that "this is an 'access to justice' issue. Litigants in the economic position of this plaintiff, absent any evidence or suggestion that their claim is frivolous or vexatious or otherwise without merit, have little or no ability to fund the cost of litigation in today's economy."

Scott dismissed an appeal of the severance, citing the "modernization" of the Court of Queen's Bench Rules that took place since Investors Syndicate (including the amendment of rule 1.04(1), under the heading "General principles", to read "These rules shall be liberally construed to secure the just, most expeditious and least expensive determination of every civil proceeding on its merits") and the "trend, or evolution, in [the jurisprudence of other] provinces towards a more liberal approach to severance" with which he agreed. He wrote:

Post-judicial career 
Scott retired from the Court of Appeal on March 1, 2013, less than three weeks before he reached the mandatory retirement age of 75 years. Following his retirement from the bench, he joined Hill Sokalski Walsh Olson as counsel on February 2, 2015, where he conducts an arbitration and mediation practice.

In July 2017, he was appointed to the Supreme Court Advisory Board by Prime Minister Justin Trudeau. The board's mandate is to provide an independent, merit-based recommendation to fill the vacancy created by the upcoming retirement of Chief Justice Beverley McLachlin.

References

Footnotes

Bibliography

Further reading 

 
 
 
 

1938 births
20th-century Canadian lawyers
20th-century Canadian judges
21st-century Canadian lawyers
21st-century Canadian judges
Arbitrators
Canadian King's Counsel
Chief justices
Judges in Manitoba
Lawyers in Manitoba
Living people
Members of the Order of Manitoba
Officers of the Order of Canada
20th-century King's Counsel
University of Manitoba alumni